Vendrell is a surname. Notable people with the surname include:

Joan Maria Vendrell Martínez (born 1976), Spanish ski mountaineer
Xavier Vendrell (born 1966), Spanish politician
Fernando Vendrell (born 1962), Portuguese film director and producer
Carme Solé Vendrell (born 1944), Spanish writer and illustrator
Josep Vendrell, Spanish army officer and president of FC Barcelona
Armida (actress) - Armida Vendrell (1911–1989), Mexican film actress and singer

See also
El Vendrell, town in Spain

References